Effner is an unincorporated community on the border of the U.S. states of Illinois and Indiana.  It lies principally in Iroquois County, Illinois and partially in Newton County, Indiana.

History
Effner was founded ca. 1860 and originally known as Haxby. A post office was established at Effner in 1899, but closed shortly thereafter in 1901.

Geography
Effner is located at  along US Routes 52 and 24 just east of the town of Sheldon.  Most of Effner lies along the eastern edge of Sheldon Township in Iroquois County, Illinois; the local grain elevators and the defunct railway station are across the border in Jefferson Township in Newton County, Indiana.  A line of the Toledo, Peoria and Western Railway connecting Sheldon and Kentland passes through town just south of the highway.

References

Unincorporated communities in Iroquois County, Illinois
Unincorporated communities in Newton County, Indiana
U.S. Route 24
U.S. Route 52